Oncomeris flavicornis is a species of true bugs belonging to the family Tessaratomidae.

Description
This bug shows the typical family shield, robust hind legs, a dark brown body with red markings and yellowish antennae (hence the Latin species name flavicornis, meaning golden horn.

Distribution
This species can be found in New Guinea, Indonesia and Queensland, Australia.

References

Tessaratomidae
Fauna of Papua New Guinea